A great power is a nation or state that, through its economic, political and military strength, is able to exert power and influence not only over its own region of the world, but beyond to others.

In a modern context, recognized great powers first arose in Europe during the post-Napoleonic era. The formalization of the division between small powers and great powers came about with the signing of the Treaty of Chaumont in 1814.

The historical terms "Great Nation", a distinguished aggregate of people inhabiting a particular country or territory, and "Great Empire", a considerable group of states or countries under a single supreme authority, are colloquial; their use is seen in ordinary historical conversations.

Early modern powers

Kingdom of France 

1535–1789

France was a dominant empire possessing many colonies in various locations around the world. During Louis XIV's long reign, from 1643 to 1715, France was the leading European power as Europe's most populous, richest and powerful country. The Empire of the French (1804–1814), also known as the Greater French Empire or First French Empire, but more commonly known as the Napoleonic Empire, was also the dominant power of much of continental Europe and, it ruled over 90 million people and was the sole power in Europe if not the world as Britain was the only main rival during the early 19th Century. From the 16th to the 17th centuries, the First French colonial empire stretched from a total area at its peak in 1680 to over 10,000,000 km2 (3,900,000 sq mi), the second largest empire in the world at the time behind only the Spanish Empire. It had many possesstions around the world, mainly in the Americas, Asia and Africa. At its peak in 1750, French India had an area of 1.5 million km2 and a totaled population of 100 million people and was the most populous colony under French rule.

Napoleon became Emperor of the French on 18 May 1804 and crowned Emperor 2 December 1804, ending the period of the French Consulate, and won early military victories in the War of the Third Coalition against Austria, Prussia, Russia, Portugal, and allied nations, notably at the Battle of Austerlitz (1805) and the Battle of Friedland (1807). The Treaty of Tilsit in July 1807 ended two years of bloodshed on the European continent. Subsequent years of military victories known collectively as the Napoleonic Wars extended French influence over much of Western Europe and into Poland. At its height in 1812, the French Empire had 130 départements, ruled over 90 million subjects, maintained extensive military presence in Germany, Italy, Spain, and the Duchy of Warsaw, and could count Prussia, Russia and Austria as nominal allies.

Early French victories exported many ideological features of the French Revolution throughout Europe. Napoleon gained support by appealing to some common concerns of the people. In France, these included fear by some of a restoration of the ancien régime, a dislike of the Bourbons and the emigrant nobility who had escaped the country, a suspicion of foreign kings who had tried to reverse the Revolution – and a wish by Jacobins to extend France's revolutionary ideals.

The feudal system was abolished, aristocratic privileges were eliminated in all places except Poland, and the introduction of the Napoleonic Code throughout the continent increased legal equality, established jury systems, and legalized divorce. Napoleon placed relatives on the thrones of several European countries and granted many titles, most of which expired with the fall of the Empire. Napoleon wished to make an alliance with South India Mysore ruler Tipu Sultan and provide them French-trained army during the Anglo-Mysore Wars, with the continuous aim of having an eventual open way to attack the British in India.

Historians have estimated the death toll from the Napoleonic Wars to be 6.5 million people, or 15% of the French Empire's subjects. The War of the Sixth Coalition, a coalition of Austria, Prussia, Russia, the United Kingdom, Sweden, Spain and a number of German States finally defeated France and drove Napoleon Bonaparte into exile on Elba. After Napoleon's disastrous invasion of Russia, the continental powers joined Russia, Britain, Portugal and the rebels in Spain. With their armies reorganized, they drove Napoleon out of Germany in 1813 and invaded France in 1814, forcing Napoleon to abdicate and thus leading to the restoration of Bourbon rule.

Tsardom of Russia and Russian Empire 
 1547–1917

The Russian Empire formed from what was Tsardom of Russia under Peter the Great. Emperor Peter I (1682–1725) fought numerous wars and expanded an already vast empire into a major European power. He moved the capital from Moscow to the new model city of Saint Petersburg, which was largely built according to Western design. He led a cultural revolution that replaced some of the traditionalist and medieval social and political mores with a modern, scientific, Western-oriented, and rationalist system. Empress Catherine the Great (1762–1796) presided over a golden age; she expanded the state by conquest, colonization, and diplomacy, while continuing Peter I's policy of modernization along Western European lines. Emperor Alexander I (1801–1825) played a major role in defeating Napoleon's ambitions to control Europe, as well as constituting the Holy Alliance of conservative monarchies. Russia further expanded to the west, south and east, becoming one of the most powerful European empires of the time. Its victories in the Russo-Turkish Wars were checked by defeat in the Crimean War (1853–1856), which led to a period of reform and intensified expansion in Central Asia. Following these conquests, Russia's territories spanned across Eurasia, with its western borders ending in eastern Poland, and its eastern borders ending in Alaska. The majority of the population lived in European Russia. More than 100 different ethnic groups lived in the Russian Empire, with ethnic Russians composing about 45% of the population. Emperor Alexander II (1855–1881) initiated numerous reforms, most dramatically the emancipation of all 23 million serfs in 1861.

Qing dynasty (China) 
 1680s – 1820s

The Qing dynasty was the last ruling dynasty of China, established in 1636 and collapsed in 1912 (with a brief, abortive restoration in 1917). It was preceded by the Ming dynasty and followed by the Republic of China. The dynasty was founded by the Manchu clan Aisin Gioro in what is today Northeast China (also known as "Manchuria"). Starting in 1644, it expanded into China proper and its surrounding territories. Complete pacification of China proper was accomplished around 1683 under the Kangxi Emperor. The multiethnic Qing Empire lasted for almost three centuries and assembled the territorial base for modern China. It was the largest Chinese dynasty and in 1790 the fourth largest empire in world history in terms of territorial size. With a population of 432 million in 1912, it was the world's most populous country at the time. The Qing dynasty also reached its economic peak in 1820, when it became the world's largest economy, and contributing to 30% of world GDP.

Originally the Later Jin dynasty, the dynasty changed its official name to "Great Qing", meaning "clear" or "pellucid", in 1636. In 1644, Beijing was sacked by a coalition of rebel forces led by Li Zicheng, a minor Ming official who later proclaimed the Shun dynasty. The last Ming emperor, the Chongzhen Emperor, committed suicide when the city fell, marking the official end of the Ming dynasty. Qing forces then allied with Ming general Wu Sangui and seized control of Beijing and expel Shun forces from the city.

The Qing dynasty reached its height in the ages of the Kangxi Emperor, Yongzheng Emperor and the Qianlong Emperor. The Ten Great Campaigns and in addition, the conquest of the western territories of the Mongols, Tibetans, and Muslims under the rule of the Qing were another factor of prosperity. Again, the skillful rule of the era's emperors allowed for this success. Rule through chiefdoms in territories like Taiwan, allowed for the conquered peoples to retain their culture and be ruled by their own people while the Qing Empire still possessed the ultimate control and rule. These such ruling tactics created for little need or reason for rebellion of the conquered. Another aspect of Manchu rule under the Qing Empire was rule within modern day China. The Mongols' attempt to rule may have failed because they attempted to rule from the outside. The High Qing emperors ruled from within, enabling them to obtain and retain stable and efficient control of the state.

A new generation of emperors that combined the strengths of their culture in addition to a level of sinicization of the conquered cultures in order to combine assimilation and the retaining of their own cultural identity. This was initiated with the Kangxi Emperor who was in power at the initiation of the High Qing. As an emperor he elevated the status of the Qing Empire through his passion for education in combination with his military expertise, and his restructuring of the bureaucracy into that of a cosmopolitan one. His son and successor, the Yongzheng Emperor ruled differently through more harsh and brutal tactics, but was also an efficient and unprecedented level of commitment to the betterment of the empire. The last successful emperor of the High Qing was the Qianlong Emperor who, following in the footsteps of his father and grandfather, was a well-rounded ruler who created the peak of the High Qing Empire. The unique and unprecedented ruling techniques of these three emperors, and the emphasis on multiculturalism fostered the productivity and success that is the High Qing era.

A heavy revival of the arts was another characteristic of the High Qing Empire. Through commercialization, items such as porcelain were mass-produced and used in trade. Also, literature was emphasized as Imperial libraries were erected, and literacy rates of men and women both, rose within the elite class. The significance of education and art in this era is that it created for economic stimulation that would last for a period of over fifty years.
After his death, the dynasty faced changes in the world system, foreign instrusion, internal revolts, population growth, economic disruption, official corruption, and the reluctance of Confucian elites to change their mindsets. With peace and prosperity, the population rose to some 400 million, but taxes and government revenues were fixed at a low rate, soon leading to a fiscal crisis.

Mughal Empire (India) 
 1526–1857

The Mughal Empire was founded in 1526 by Babur of the Barlas clan after his victories at the First Battle of Panipat and the Battle of Khanwa against the Delhi Sultanate and Rajput Confederation. Over the next centuries under Akbar, Jahangir, Shah Jahan, the mughal empire would grow in area and power and dominate the Indian subcontinent reaching its maximum extent under Emperor Aurangzeb. This imperial structure lasted until 1720, shortly after the Mughal-Maratha Wars and the death Aurangzeb, losing its influence to reveal powers such as the Maratha Empire and the Sikh Confederacy. The empire was formally dissolved by the British Raj after the Indian Rebellion of 1857.

The gross domestic product (GDP) of the Mughal Empire in 1600 was estimated at 22% of the world economy, the second largest in the world, behind only Ming China but larger than Europe. By 1700, the GDP of Mughal India had risen to 24% of the world economy, the largest in the world, larger than both Qing China and Western Europe.  The Mughal empire was producing about 25% of the world's industrial output up until the 18th century. India's GDP growth increased under the Mughal Empire. The exchequer of the Emperor Aurangzeb reported an annual revenue of more than £100 million, or $450 million, making him one of the wealthiest monarchs in the world at the time. The empire had an extensive road network, which was vital to the economic infrastructure, built by a public works department set up by the Mughals, linking towns and cities across the empire, making trade easier to conduct.

The Mughals adopted and standardised the rupee (rupiya, or silver) and dam (copper) currencies introduced by Sur Emperor Sher Shah Suri during his brief rule. The currency was initially 48 dams to a single rupee in the beginning of Akbar's reign, before it later became 38 dams to a rupee in the 1580s, with the dam's value rising further in the 17th century as a result of new industrial uses for copper, such as in bronze cannons and brass utensils. The dam's value was later worth 30 to a rupee towards the end of Jahangir's reign, and then 16 to a rupee by the 1660s. The Mughals minted coins with high purity, never dropping below 96%, and without debasement until the 1720s.

A Major sector of the Mughal Economy was agriculture A variety of crops were grown, including food crops such as wheat, rice, and barley, and non-food cash crops such as cotton, indigo and opium. By the mid-17th century, Indian cultivators begun to extensively grow imported from the Americas, maize and tobacco. The Mughal administration emphasised agrarian reform, started by Sher Shah Suri, the work of which Akbar adopted and furthered with more reforms. The civil administration was organised in a hierarchical manner on the basis of merit, with promotions based on performance, exemplified by the common use of the seed drill among Indian peasants, and built irrigation systems across the empire, which produced much higher crop yields and increased the net revenue base, leading to increased agricultural production.

Manufacturing was also a significant contributor to the Mughal Economy.  The Mughal empire produced about 25% of the world's industrial output up until the end of the 18th century.  Manufactured goods and cash crops from the Mughal Empire were sold throughout the world. Key industries included textiles, shipbuilding, and steel. Processed products included cotton textiles, yarns, thread, silk, jute products, metalware, and foods such as sugar, oils and butter The Mughal Empire also took advantage of the demand of products from Mughal India in Europe, particularly cotton textiles, as well as goods such as spices, peppers, indigo, silks, and saltpeter (for use in munitions). European fashion, for example, became increasingly dependent on Mughal Indian textiles and silks. From the late 17th century to the early 18th century, Mughal India accounted for 95% of British imports from Asia, and the Bengal Subah province alone accounted for 40% of Dutch imports from Asia.

The largest manufacturing industry in the Mughal Empire was textile manufacturing, particularly cotton textile manufacturing, which included the production of piece goods, calicos, and muslins, Indian cotton textiles were the most important manufactured goods in world trade in the 18th century, consumed across the world from the Americas to Japan. By the early 18th century, Mughal Indian textiles were clothing people across the Indian subcontinent, Southeast Asia, Europe, the Americas, Africa, and the Middle East. The most important centre of cotton production was the Bengal province, particularly around its capital city of Dhaka.

First British Empire 
 1600–1783

The First British empire began in the 17th century as a combination of factors led to its creation, such as the growth in British trade with Mughal India, the success of the British East India Company, numerous British maritime explorations around the world, and the vast Royal Navy. The British Empire comprised the dominions, colonies, protectorates, mandates, and other territories ruled or administered by the United Kingdom. It originated with the overseas colonies and trading posts established by England in the late 16th and early 17th centuries.

During the 17th and 18th centuries, British colonies were created along the east coast of North America, but by the late 18th century 13 of them rebelled in the American War of Independence (1775–1783) and formed the United States of America.

The Second British Empire was built primarily in Asia, the Middle East and Africa after 1800. It included colonies in Canada, the Caribbean, and India, and shortly thereafter began the settlement of Australia and New Zealand. Following France's 1815 defeat in the Napoleonic Wars, Great Britain took possession of many more overseas territories in Africa and Asia, and established informal empires of free trade in South America, Persia, etc.

At its height the British Empire was the largest empire in history and, for over a century, was the foremost global power. In 1815–1914 the Pax Britannica was the most powerful unitary authority in history due to the Royal Navy's unprecedented naval predominance.

Spanish Empire 

 1492–1799
In the 16th century Spain and Portugal were in the vanguard of European global exploration and colonial expansion and the opening of trade routes across the oceans, with trade flourishing across the Atlantic Ocean between Spain and the Americas and across the Pacific Ocean between Asia-Pacific and Mexico via the Philippines. Conquistadors toppled the Aztec, Inca, and Maya civilizations, and laid claim to vast stretches of land in North and South America. For a long time, the Spanish Empire dominated the oceans with its navy and ruled the European battlefield with its infantry, the famous tercios. Spain enjoyed a cultural golden age in the 16th and 17th centuries as Europe's foremost power.

From 1580 to 1640 the Spanish Empire and the Portuguese Empire were conjoined in a personal union of its Habsburg monarchs, during the period of the Iberian Union, though the empires continued to be administered separately.

From the middle of the 16th century silver and gold from the American mines increasingly financed the military capability of Habsburg Spain, then the foremost global power, in its long series of European and North African wars. Until the loss of its American colonies in the 19th century, Spain maintained one of the largest empires in the world, even though it suffered fluctuating military and economic fortunes from the 1640s. Confronted by the new experiences, difficulties and suffering created by empire-building, Spanish thinkers formulated some of the first modern thoughts on natural law, sovereignty, international law, war, and economics – they even questioned the legitimacy of imperialism – in related schools of thought referred to collectively as the School of Salamanca.

Constant contention with rival powers caused territorial, commercial, and religious conflict that contributed to the slow decline of Spanish power from the mid-17th century. In the Mediterranean, Spain warred constantly with the Ottoman Empire; on the European continent, France became comparably strong. Overseas, Spain was initially rivaled by Portugal, and later by the English and Dutch. In addition, English-, French-, and Dutch-sponsored privateering and piracy, overextension of Spanish military commitments in its territories, increasing government corruption, and economic stagnation caused by military expenditures ultimately contributed to the empire's weakening.

Spain's European empire was finally undone by the Peace of Utrecht (1713), which stripped Spain of its remaining territories in Italy and the Low Countries. Spain's fortunes improved thereafter, but it remained a second-rate power in Continental European politics. However, Spain maintained and enlarged its vast overseas empire until the 19th century, when the shock of the Peninsular War sparked declarations of independence in Quito (1809), Venezuela and Paraguay (1811) and successive revolutions that split away its territories on the mainland (the Spanish Main) of the Americas.

Portugal 
 1415–1799

The Portuguese Empire was the first global empire in history, and also the earliest and longest-lived of the Western European colonial empires. Portugal's small size and population restricted the empire, in the 16th century, to a collection of small but well defended outposts along the African coasts, the main exceptions being Angola, Mozambique and Brazil. For most of the 16th century, the Portuguese Indian Armadas, then the world leader navy in shipbuilding and naval artillery, dominated most of the Atlantic Ocean south of the Canary Islands, the Indian Ocean and the access to the western Pacific. The height of the empire was reached in the 16th century but the indifference of the Habsburg kings and the competition with new colonial empires like the British, French and Dutch started its long and gradual decline. After the 18th century Portugal concentrated in the colonization of Brazil and African possessions.

However, as it was not possible at the time to correctly measure longitude, the exact boundary was disputed by the two countries until 1777. The completion of these negotiations with Spain is one of several reasons proposed by historians for why it took nine years for the Portuguese to follow up on Dias's voyage to the Cape of Good Hope, though it has also been speculated that other voyages were in fact secretly taking place during that time. Whether or not this was the case, the long-standing Portuguese goal of finding a sea route to Asia was finally achieved in a ground-breaking voyage commanded by Vasco da Gama.

Dutch Empire 
 1581–1795

The Dutch Empire controlled various territories after the Dutch achieved independence from Spain in the 16th century. The strength of their shipping industry and the expansion of trading routes between Europe and the Orient bolstered the strength of the overseas colonial empire which lasted from the 16th to the 20th century. The Dutch initially built up colonial possessions on the basis of indirect state capitalist corporate colonialism, as small European trading-companies often lacked the capital or the manpower for large-scale operations. The States General chartered larger organisations—the Dutch West India Company and the Dutch East India Company—in the early seventeenth century to enlarge the scale of trading operations in the West Indies and the Orient respectively. These trading operations eventually became one of the largest and most extensive maritime trading companies at the time, and once held a virtual monopoly on strategic European shipping-routes westward through the Southern Hemisphere around South America through the Strait of Magellan, and eastward around Africa, past the Cape of Good Hope. The companies' domination of global commerce contributed greatly to a commercial revolution and a cultural flowering in the Netherlands of the 17th century, known as the Dutch Golden Age. During the Dutch Golden Age, Dutch trade, science and art were among the most acclaimed in Europe. Dutch military power was at its height in the middle of the 17th century and in that era the Dutch navy was the most powerful navy in the world.

By the middle of the 17th century, the Dutch had overtaken Portugal as the dominant player in the spice and silk trade, and in 1652 founded a colony at Cape Town on the coast of South Africa, as a way-station for its ships on the route between Europe and Asia. After the first settlers spread out around the Company station, nomadic white livestock farmers, or Trekboers, moved more widely afield, leaving the richer, but limited, farming lands of the coast for the drier interior tableland. Between 1602 and 1796, many Europeans were sent to work in the Asia trade. The majority died of disease or made their way back to Europe, but some of them made the Indies their new home. Interaction between the Dutch and native population mainly took place in Sri Lanka and the modern Indonesian Islands. In some Dutch colonies there are major ethnic groups of Dutch ancestry descending from emigrated Dutch settlers. In South Africa the Boers and Cape Dutch are collectively known as the Afrikaners. The Burgher people of Sri Lanka and the Indo people of Indonesia as well as the Creoles of Suriname are mixed race people of Dutch descent. In the USA there have been three American presidents of Dutch descent: Martin Van Buren, the first president who was not of British descent, and whose first language was Dutch, the 26th president Theodore Roosevelt, and Franklin D. Roosevelt, the 32nd president, elected to four terms in office (1933 to 1945) and the only U.S. president to have served more than two terms.

In their search for new trade passages between Asia and Europe, Dutch navigators explored and charted distant regions such as Australia, New Zealand, Tasmania, and parts of the eastern coast of North America. During the period of proto-industrialization, the empire received 50% of textiles and 80% of silks import from the India's Mughal Empire, chiefly from its most developed region known as Bengal Subah.

In the 18th century, the Dutch colonial empire began to decline as a result of the Fourth Anglo-Dutch War of 1780–1784, in which the Dutch Republic lost a number of its colonial possessions and trade monopolies to the British Empire, along with the conquest of the Mughal Bengal at the Battle of Plassey by the East India Company. Nevertheless, major portions of the empire survived until the advent of global decolonisation following World War II, namely the East Indies and Dutch Guiana. Three former colonial territories in the West Indies islands around the Caribbean Sea—Aruba, Curaçao, and Sint Maarten—remain as constituent countries represented within the Kingdom of the Netherlands.

Ottoman Empire 
1453 – 1908

The Ottoman Empire was a Turkic state, which at the height of its power (16th–17th centuries) spanned three continents (see: extent of Ottoman territories) controlling parts of Southeastern Europe, the Middle East and most of North Africa. The empire has been called by historians a "Universal Empire" due to both Roman and Islamic traditions. It was the head of the Gunpowder Empires.

The empire was at the center of interactions between the Eastern and Western worlds for six centuries. The Ottoman Empire was the only Islamic power to seriously challenge the rising power of Western Europe between the 15th and 19th centuries. With Istanbul (or Constantinople) as its capital, the Empire was in some respects an Islamic successor of earlier Mediterranean empires—the Roman and Byzantine empires.

Ottoman military reform efforts begin with Selim III (1789–1807) who made the first major attempts to modernize the army along European lines. These efforts, however, were hampered by reactionary movements, partly from the religious leadership, but primarily from the Janissary corps, who had become anarchic and ineffectual. Jealous of their privileges and firmly opposed to change, they created a Janissary revolt. Selim's efforts cost him his throne and his life, but were resolved in spectacular and bloody fashion by his successor, the dynamic Mahmud II, who massacred the Janissary corps in 1826.

The effective military and bureaucratic structures of the previous century also came under strain during a protracted period of misrule by weak Sultans. But in spite of these difficulties, the Empire remained a major expansionist power until the Battle of Vienna in 1683, which marked the end of Ottoman expansion into Europe.  Much of the decline took place in the 19th century under pressure from Russia. Egypt and the Balkans were lost by 1913, and the Empire disintegrated after the First World War, leaving Turkey as the successor state.

Papacy and Papal States 

 1420–1648
The Papacy was considered one of the great powers of the age by important thinkers such as Machiavelli and Giovanni Botero. The Papal States covered central Italy and were expanded by warrior popes such as Julius II. Italy, although divided in several states, saw a period of great prosperity during the Renaissance. In 1420, Pope Martin V re-established Rome as the sole seat of the Catholic Church and put an end to the Western Schism. Between 1494 and the second half of the 16th century, Italy was the battleground of Europe. Competing monarchs, including Popes, clashed for European supremacy in Italy. In the late 1500s and early 1600s, the Papacy led the Counter-reformation effort. Pontiffs such as Paul III and Pius V, exercised great diplomatic influence in Europe. Popes mediated the Peace of Nice (1538) between the Holy Roman Empire and France, as well as the Peace of Vervins (1598) between France and Spain. In the new world, thousands were converted to Catholicism by missionaries. Many European and Italian states (such as the Republic of Venice and the Republic of Genoa) were brought by the Papacy into "Holy Leagues" to defeat the Ottoman Empire: defeats occurred in Rhodes (1522), Preveza (1538), Budapes (1541), Algiers (1541), whereas victories took place at Vienna (1529), Tunis (1535), Lepanto (1571), and Malta (1565). Similarly, the Church supported catholic leagues in the European wars of religion fought in France, the Low Countries, and Germany. France remained catholic following the conversion of the French king, whereas half of the Low Countries were lost to Protestantism. It was the 30 years war that ultimately ended the status of the Papacy as a great power. Although the Pope declared Westphalia "null and void", European rulers refused to obey Papal orders and even rejected Papal mediation at the negotiations of the treaty.

Toungoo Empire of Burma 
 1510–1599

The First Toungoo Empire (also known as the First Toungoo Dynasty, the Second Burmese Empire or simply the Toungoo Empire) was the dominant power in mainland Southeast Asia in the second half of the 16th century. At its peak, Toungoo "exercised suzerainty from Manipur to the Cambodian marches and from the borders of Arakan to Yunnan" and was "probably the largest empire in the history of Southeast Asia"/ The Toungoo Dynasty was the "most adventurous and militarily successful" in Burmese history, but it was also the "shortest-lived".

The empire grew out of the principality of Toungoo, a minor vassal state of Ava until 1510. The landlocked petty state began its rise in the 1530s under Tabinshwehti who went on to found the largest polity in Myanmar since the Pagan Empire by 1550. His more celebrated successor Bayinnaung then greatly expanded the empire, conquering much of mainland Southeast Asia by 1565. He spent the next decade keeping the empire intact, putting down rebellions in Siam, Lan Xang and the northernmost Shan states. From 1576 onwards, he declared a large sphere of influence in westerly lands—trans-Manipur states, Arakan and Ceylon. The empire, held together by patron-client relationships, declined soon after his death in 1581. His successor Nanda never gained the full support of the vassal rulers, and presided over the empire's precipitous collapse in the next 18 years.

The First Toungoo Empire marked the end of the period of petty kingdoms in mainland Southeast Asia. Although the overextended empire proved ephemeral, the forces that underpinned its rise were not. Its two main successor states—Restored Toungoo Burma and Ayutthaya Siam—went on to dominate western and central mainland Southeast Asia, respectively, down to the mid-18th century.

Iran

Safavid Empire 
 1501–1736
The Safavid Empire was one of the most significant ruling dynasties of Iran. They ruled one of the greatest Iranian Empires after the Muslim conquest of Persia The Safavids ruled from 1501 to 1736 and at their height, they controlled all of modern Iran, Azerbaijan and Armenia, most of Iraq, Georgia, Afghanistan, and the Caucasus, as well as parts of modern-day Pakistan, Turkmenistan and Turkey. Safavid Iran was one of the Islamic "gunpowder empires". The Safavid empire originated from Ardabil in Iran and had its origins in a long established Sufi order, called the Safaviyeh. The Safavids established an independent unified Iranian state for the first time after the Muslim conquest of Persia and reasserted Iranian political identity, and established Shia Islam as the official religion in Iran.

Despite their demise in 1736, the legacy that they left behind was the revival of Iran as an economic stronghold between East and West, the establishment of an efficient state and bureaucracy based upon "checks and balances", their architectural innovations and their patronage for fine arts. The Safavids have also left their mark down to the present era by spreading Shi'a Islam in Iran, as well as major parts of the Caucasus, Mesopotamia, and Anatolia.

Afsharid Empire 
The Afsharid dynasty was an Iranian dynasty that originated from the Afshar tribe in Iran's north-eastern province of Khorasan, ruling Iran in the mid-eighteenth century. The dynasty was founded in 1736 by the military genius Nader Shah, who deposed the last member of the Safavid dynasty and proclaimed himself as the Shah of Iran. At its peak, the empire was arguably the most powerful in the world. During Nader's reign, Iran reached its greatest extent since the Sasanian Empire. At its height it controlled modern-day Iran, Armenia, Georgia, Azerbaijan Republic, parts of the North Caucasus (Dagestan), Afghanistan, Bahrain, Turkmenistan, Uzbekistan and Pakistan, and parts of Iraq, Turkey, United Arab Emirates and Oman.

Polish-Lithuanian Commonwealth
 1410–1699

The union of the Kingdom of Poland and the Grand Duchy of Lithuania, formed in 1385, emerged as a major power in Central and Eastern Europe following its victory at the Battle of Grunwald in 1410. Poland–Lithuania covered a large territory in Central and Eastern Europe, making it the largest state in Europe at the time. Through its territorial possessions and vassal principalities and protectorates, its influence extended from the Baltic Sea to the Black Sea, reaching Livonia (present-day Estonia and Latvia) in the north, and Moldavia and Crimea in the south and southeast. In the 15th century the ruling Jagiellonian dynasty managed to place its members on the thrones of the neighbouring kingdoms of Bohemia and Hungary, becoming one of the most powerful houses in Europe.

The Rzeczpospolita was one of the largest, most powerful and most populous countries in 16th, 17th, and 18th century Europe. In fact, Poland was a superpower that imposed its policy on weaker neighbors. Its political structure was formed in 1569 by the Union of Lublin, which transformed the previous Polish–Lithuanian union into the Polish–Lithuanian Commonwealth, and lasted in this form until the adoption of the Constitution of May 3, 1791. In the 16th century, the area of the Rzeczpospolita reached almost 1 million km2, with a population of 11 million. At that time, it was the third largest country in Europe, and the largest country of Western Christian Europe. Poland was a political, military and economic power.

The Union possessed features unique among contemporary states. This political system unusual for its time stemmed from the ascendance of the szlachta noble class over other social classes and over the political system of monarchy. In time, the szlachta accumulated enough privileges (such as those established by the Nihil novi Act of 1505) that no monarch could hope to break the szlachta's grip on power. The Commonwealth's political system does not readily fit into a simple category; it may best be described as a melange of:
 confederation and federation, with regard to the broad autonomy of its regions. It is, however, difficult to decisively call the Commonwealth either confederation or federation, as it had some qualities of both of them;
 oligarchy, as only the szlachta—around 15% of the population—had political rights;
 democracy, since all the szlachta were equal in rights and privileges, and the Sejm could veto the king on important matters, including legislation (the adoption of new laws), foreign affairs, declaration of war, and taxation (changes of existing taxes or the levying of new ones). Also, the 9% of Commonwealth population who enjoyed those political rights (the szlachta) was a substantially larger percentage than in majority European countries; note that in 1789 in France only about 1% of the population had the right to vote, and in 1867 in the United Kingdom, only about 3%.
 elective monarchy, since the monarch, elected by the szlachta, was Head of State;
 constitutional monarchy, since the monarch was bound by pacta conventa and other laws, and the szlachta could disobey decrees of the king that they deemed illegal.
The Polish "Golden Age", in the reigns of Sigismund I and Sigismund II, the last two Jagiellonian kings, and more generally the 16th century, is identified with the culture of the Polish Renaissance. This flowering had its material base in the prosperity of the elites, both the landed nobility and urban patriciate at such centers as Kraków and Gdańsk. The University of Kraków became one of the leading centers of learning in Europe, and in Poland Nicolaus Copernicus formulated a model of the universe that placed the Sun rather than Earth at its center, making a groundbreaking contribution, which sparked the Scientific Revolution in Europe. Following the Union of Lublin, at various times, through personal unions and vassalages, Poland's sphere of influence reached Sweden and Finland in Northern Europe, the Danube in Southeastern Europe, and the Caribbean and West Africa. After victories in the Dimitriads (the Battle of Klushino, 1610), with Polish forces entering Moscow, Sigismund III's son, Prince Władysław of Poland, was briefly elected Tsar of Russia.  The victory of Polish-led forces at the Battle of Vienna in 1683 saved Austria from Ottoman conquest and marked the end of Ottoman advances into Europe.

Swedish Empire 
 1611–1721

Sweden emerged as a great European power under Axel Oxenstierna and King Gustavus Adolphus. As a result of acquiring territories seized from Russia and the Polish–Lithuanian Commonwealth, as well as its involvement in the Thirty Years' War, Sweden found itself transformed into the leader of Protestantism. The mid-17th and early 18th centuries were Sweden's most successful years as a Great Power. Sweden also had colonial possessions as a minor colonial Empire that existed from 1638 to 1663 and later from 1784 to 1878. Sweden founded overseas colonies, principally in the New World. New Sweden was founded in the valley of the Delaware River in 1638, and Sweden later laid claim to a number of Caribbean islands. A string of Swedish forts and trading posts was constructed along the coast of West Africa as well, but these were not designed for Swedish settlers.

Sweden reached its largest territorial extent during the rule of Charles X (1622–1660) after the treaty of Roskilde in 1658. After half a century of expansive warfare, the Swedish economy had deteriorated. It would become the lifetime task of Charles' son, Charles XI (1655–1697), to rebuild the economy and refit the army. His legacy to his son, the coming ruler of Sweden Charles XII, was one of the finest arsenals in the world, with a large standing army and a great fleet. Sweden's largest threat at this time, Russia, had a larger army but was far behind in both equipment and training. The Swedish army crushed the Russians at the Battle of Narva in 1700, one of the first battles of the Great Northern War. This led to an overambitious campaign against Russia in 1707, however, ending in a decisive Russian victory at the Battle of Poltava (1709). The campaign had a successful opening for Sweden, which came to occupy half of Poland and Charles laid claim to the Polish throne. But after a long march exposed by cossack raids, the Russian Tsar Peter the Great's scorched-earth techniques and the very cold Russian climate, the Swedes stood weakened with shattered confidence and enormously outnumbered by the Russian army at Poltava.

During the Thirty Years' War, Sweden managed to conquer approximately half of the member states of the Holy Roman Empire. The fortunes of war would shift back and forth several times. After its defeat in the Battle of Nördlingen (1634), confidence in Sweden among the Swedish-controlled German states was damaged, and several of the provinces refused further Swedish military support, leaving Sweden with only a couple of northern German provinces. After France intervened on the same side as Sweden, fortunes shifted again. As the war continued, the civilian and military death toll grew, and when it was over, it led to severe depopulation in the German states. Although exact population estimates do not exist, historians estimate that the population of the Holy Roman Empire fell by one-third as a result of the war.

Egypt 
 1805–1882, 1882–1914

The Egyptian Khedivate was a major world and regional power which began to emerge starting from the defeat and expulsion of Napoleon Bonaparte from Egypt. This modern-age Egyptian Empire has expanded to control several countries and nations including present-day Sudan, South Sudan, Eritrea, Djibouti, northern Somalia, Israel, Lebanon, Jordan, Syria, Greece, Cyprus, southern and central Turkey, in addition to parts from Libya, Chad, Central African Republic, and Democratic Republic of Congo, as well as northwestern Saudi Arabia, parts of Yemen and the Kingdom of Hejaz. During that era, Egypt has succeeded to re-emerged again to its previous centuries-long glory as a global Islamic power to an extent that was even stronger and healthier than the fading Ottoman Empire. Egypt maintained its status as a regional power until the British occupation of the country after the Anglo-Egyptian War.

The Egyptian-based Albanian Muhammad Ali dynasty has brought several social, educational, political, economic, judicial, strategic and military reforms that have deeply depended on the human resources of Egyptians as the native powerhouse of the country instead of depending on foreigner Circassians and Turks who were associated with the Ottoman warlords during the Ottoman control of Egypt. 
With the emerging world-class national Egyptian industries, the Egyptian Army has showed an international level of prowess to the extent that it was the major Islamic military in the Islamic World. Egypt became also one of the first countries in the world to introduce railway transportation.

Egypt has been successful in reforming its economy to become based on developed agriculture and modernised industries. A big number of factories have been set up and new Nile canals have been dug to increase the surface area of Egyptian fertile arable land. Another notable fact of the internationally competitive economic progress of Egypt during that era was the development of new cultivations such as Cotton, Mango and many other crops. The legacy of these agricultural advancements was the base of Egypt's current success in taking its rightful place as one of the best sources of high-quality cotton on a global scale.

High modern great powers

France 
 1815–1956

France was a dominant empire possessing many colonies in various locations around the world. The French colonial empire is the set of territories outside Europe that were under French rule primarily from the 17th century to the late 1960s (some see the French control of places such as New Caledonia as a continuation of that colonial empire). In the 19th and 20th centuries, the colonial empire of France was the second largest in the world behind the British Empire. Including metropolitan France, the total amount of land under French sovereignty reached  at the time, which is 10.0% of the Earth's total land area.

The total area of the French colonial empire, with the first (mainly in the Americas and Asia) and second (mainly in Africa and Asia), the French colonial empires combined, reached 24,000,000 km2 (9,300,000 sq mi), the second largest in the world (the first being the British Empire).

France began to establish colonies in North America, the Caribbean and India, following Spanish and Portuguese successes during the Age of Discovery, in rivalry with Britain for supremacy. A series of wars with Britain during the 18th and early 19th centuries which France lost ended its colonial ambitions on these continents, and with it is what some historians term the "first" French colonial empire. In the 19th century, France established a new empire in Africa and South East Asia. Some of these colonies lasted beyond the Second World War.

Second British Empire 
 1815–1956

The British Empire was the largest empire in world history. During the 19th century the United Kingdom was the first country in the world to industrialise and embrace free trade, giving birth to the Industrial Revolution. The rapid industrial growth after the conquests of the wealthy Mughal Bengal, transformed Great Britain into the world's largest industrial and financial power, while the world's largest navy gave it undisputed control of the seas and international trade routes, an advantage which helped the British Empire, after a mid-century liberal reaction against empire-building, to grow faster than ever before. The Victorian empire colonised large parts of Africa, including such territories as South Africa, Egypt, Kenya, Sudan, Nigeria, and Ghana, most of Oceania, colonies in the Far East, such as Singapore, Malaysia, and Hong Kong, and took control over the whole Indian subcontinent, making it the largest empire in the world.

After victory in the First World War, the Empire gained control of territories such as Tanzania and Namibia from the German Empire, and Iraq and Palestine (including the Transjordan) from the Ottoman Empire. By this point in 1920 the British empire had grown to become the largest empire in history, controlling approximately 25% of the world's land surface and 25% of the world's population. It covered about 36.6 million km2 (14.2 million square miles). Because of its magnitude, it was often referred to as the empire on which the sun never sets.

The political and social changes and economic disruption in the United Kingdom and throughout the world caused by First World War followed only two decades later by the Second World War caused the Empire to gradually break up as colonies were given independence. Much of the reason the Empire ceased was because many colonies by the mid-20th century were no longer as undeveloped as at the arrival of British control nor as dependent and social changes throughout the world during the first half of the 20th century gave rise to national identity. The British Government, reeling from the economic cost of two successive world wars and changing social attitudes towards empire, felt it could no longer afford to maintain it if the country were to recover economically, pay for the newly created welfare state, and fight the newly emerged Cold War with the Soviet Union.

The influence and power of the British Empire dropped dramatically after the Second World War, especially after the Partition of India in 1947 and the Suez Crisis in 1956. The Commonwealth of Nations is the successor to the Empire, where the United Kingdom is an equal member with all other states.

Late Spanish Empire 
 1815–1898

After the Napoleonic period the Bourbon dynasty was restored in Spain and over the huge number of Spanish territories around the world. But the shock of the Peninsular War sparked declarations of independence in the Latin America controlled by Spain and by 1835 successive revolutions had signed the end of the Spanish rule over the majority of this countries. Spain retained fragments of its empire in the Caribbean (Cuba and Puerto Rico); Asia (Philippines); and Oceania (Guam, Micronesia, Palau, and Northern Marianas) until the Spanish–American War of 1898. Spanish participation in the Scramble for Africa was minimal: Spanish Morocco was held until 1956 and Spanish Guinea and the Spanish Sahara were held until 1968 and 1975 respectively. The Canary Islands, Ceuta, Melilla and the other Plazas de Soberanía on the northern African coast have remained part of Spain.

Austrian Empire (Austria-Hungary) 
1804–1867 and 1867–1918

The Habsburg Empire became one of the key powers in Europe after the Napoleonic wars, with a sphere of influence stretching over Central Europe, Germany, and Italy. During the second half of the 19th century, the Habsburgs could not prevent the unification of Italy and Germany. Eventually, the complex internal power struggle resulted in the establishment of a so-called dual monarchy between Austria and Hungary. Following the defeat and dissolution of the monarchy after the First World War, both Austria and Hungary became independent and self-governing countries (First Austrian Republic, Kingdom of Hungary). Other political entities emerged from the destruction of the Great War including Poland, Czechoslovakia, and the Kingdom of Serbs, Croats, and Slovenes.

Prussia and Germany 
 1701–1871, 1871–1918 and 1933–1945

The Kingdom of Prussia attained its greatest importance in the 18th and 19th centuries, when it conquered various territories previously held by Sweden, Austria, Poland, France, Denmark, and various minor German principalities. It became a European great power under the reign of Frederick II of Prussia (1740–1786). It dominated northern Germany politically, economically, and in terms of population, and played a key role in the unification of Germany in 1871 (see Prussia and Germany section below).

After the territorial acquisitions of the Congress of Vienna (1815), the Kingdom of Prussia became the only great power with a majority German-speaking population. During the 19th century, Chancellor Otto von Bismarck pursued a policy of uniting the German principalities into a "Lesser Germany" which would exclude the Austrian Empire. Prussia was the core of the North German Confederation formed in 1867, which became part of the German Empire or Deutsches Reich in 1871 when the southern German states, excluding Austria, were added.

After 1850, the states of Germany had rapidly become industrialized, with particular strengths in coal, iron (and later steel), chemicals, and railways. In 1871, Germany had a population of 41 million people; by 1913, this had increased to 68 million. A heavily rural collection of states in 1815, the now united Germany became predominantly urban. The success of German industrialization manifested itself in two ways since the early 20th century: The German factories were larger and more modern than their British and French counterparts. The dominance of German Empire in natural sciences, especially in physics and chemistry was such that one-the of all Nobel Prizes went to German inventors and researchers. During its 47 years of existence, the German Empire became the industrial, technological, and scientific giant of Europe, and by 1913, Germany was the largest economy in Continental Europe and the third-largest in the world. Germany also became a great power, it built up the longest railway network of Europe, the world's strongest army, and a fast-growing industrial base. Starting very small in 1871, in a decade, the navy became second only to Britain's Royal Navy. After the removal of Otto von Bismarck by Wilhelm II in 1890, the empire embarked on Weltpolitik – a bellicose new course that ultimately contributed to the outbreak of World War I.

Wilhelm II wanted Germany to have her "place in the sun", like Britain, which he constantly wished to emulate or rival. With German traders and merchants already active worldwide, he encouraged colonial efforts in Africa and the Pacific ("new imperialism"), causing the German Empire to vie with other European powers for remaining "unclaimed" territories. With the encouragement or at least the acquiescence of Britain, which at this stage saw Germany as a counterweight to her old rival France, Germany acquired German Southwest Africa (modern Namibia), German Kamerun (modern Cameroon), Togoland (modern Togo) and German East Africa (modern Rwanda, Burundi, and the mainland part of current Tanzania). Islands were gained in the Pacific through purchase and treaties and also a 99-year lease for the territory of Kiautschou in northeast China. But of these German colonies only Togoland and German Samoa (after 1908) became self-sufficient and profitable; all the others required subsidies from the Berlin treasury for building infrastructure, school systems, hospitals and other institutions.

After the World War I broke out, Germany participated in the war as a part of the Central Powers. At its height, Germany occupied Belgium and parts of France, as well as acquired Ukraine and the Baltic States in the Treaty of Brest-Litovsk. Soon, Germany lost its status as a great power in the Treaty of Versailles as it ceded some of its territories and all of its overseas territories to the Britain and France, as well as gave up part of its military.

Germany rose back to be a great power in 1933, when the Nazi Germany replaced the Weimar Republic as the new government of Germany. The most pressing economic matter the Nazis initially faced was the 30 per cent national unemployment rate. Economist Dr. Hjalmar Schacht, President of the Reichsbank and Minister of Economics, created a scheme for deficit financing in May 1933. Capital projects were paid for with the issuance of promissory notes called Mefo bills. When the notes were presented for payment, the Reichsbank printed money. Hitler and his economic team expected that the upcoming territorial expansion would provide the means of repaying the soaring national debt. Schacht's administration achieved a rapid decline in the unemployment rate, the largest of any country during the Great Depression. Economic recovery was uneven, with reduced hours of work and erratic availability of necessities, leading to disenchantment with the regime as early as 1934.

In October 1933, the Junkers Aircraft Works was expropriated. In concert with other aircraft manufacturers and under the direction of Aviation Minister Göring, production was ramped up. From a workforce of 3,200 people producing 100 units per year in 1932, the industry grew to employ a quarter of a million workers manufacturing over 10,000 technically advanced aircraft annually less than ten years later.

An elaborate bureaucracy was created to regulate imports of raw materials and finished goods with the intention of eliminating foreign competition in the German marketplace and improving the nation's balance of payments. The Nazis encouraged the development of synthetic replacements for materials such as oil and textiles. As the market was experiencing a glut and prices for petroleum were low, in 1933 the Nazi government made a profit-sharing agreement with IG Farben, guaranteeing them a 5 per cent return on capital invested in their synthetic oil plant at Leuna. Any profits in excess of that amount would be turned over to the Reich. By 1936, Farben regretted making the deal, as excess profits were by then being generated. In another attempt to secure an adequate wartime supply of petroleum, Germany intimidated Romania into signing a trade agreement in March 1939.

Major public works projects financed with deficit spending included the construction of a network of Autobahnen and providing funding for programmes initiated by the previous government for housing and agricultural improvements. To stimulate the construction industry, credit was offered to private businesses and subsidies were made available for home purchases and repairs. On the condition that the wife would leave the workforce, a loan of up to 1,000 Reichsmarks could be accessed by young couples of Aryan descent who intended to marry, and the amount that had to be repaid was reduced by 25 per cent for each child born. The caveat that the woman had to remain unemployed outside the home was dropped by 1937 due to a shortage of skilled labourers.

Envisioning widespread car ownership as part of the new Germany, Hitler arranged for designer Ferdinand Porsche to draw up plans for the KdF-wagen (Strength Through Joy car), intended to be an automobile that everyone could afford. A prototype was displayed at the International Motor Show in Berlin on 17 February 1939. With the outbreak of World War II, the factory was converted to produce military vehicles. None were sold until after the war, when the vehicle was renamed the Volkswagen (people's car).

Six million people were unemployed when the Nazis took power in 1933 and by 1937 there were fewer than a million. This was in part due to the removal of women from the workforce. Real wages dropped by 25 per cent between 1933 and 1938. After the dissolution of the trade unions in May 1933, their funds were seized and their leadership arrested, including those who attempted to co-operate with the Nazis. A new organisation, the German Labour Front, was created and placed under Nazi Party functionary Robert Ley. The average work week was 43 hours in 1933; by 1939 this increased to 47 hours.

By early 1934, the focus shifted towards rearmament. By 1935, military expenditures accounted for 73 per cent of the government's purchases of goods and services. On 18 October 1936, Hitler named Göring as Plenipotentiary of the Four Year Plan, intended to speed up rearmament. In addition to calling for the rapid construction of steel mills, synthetic rubber plants, and other factories, Göring instituted wage and price controls and restricted the issuance of stock dividends. Large expenditures were made on rearmament in spite of growing deficits. Plans unveiled in late 1938 for massive increases to the navy and air force were impossible to fulfil, as Germany lacked the finances and material resources to build the planned units, as well as the necessary fuel required to keep them running. With the introduction of compulsory military service in 1935, the Reichswehr, which had been limited to 100,000 by the terms of the Versailles Treaty, expanded to 750,000 on active service at the start of World War II, with a million more in the reserve. By January 1939, unemployment was down to 301,800 and it dropped to only 77,500 by September.

After triumphing in economic success, the Nazis started a hostile foreign expansion policy. They first sent troops to occupy the demilitarized Rhineland in 1936, then annexed Austria and Sudetenland of Czechoslovakia in 1938. In 1939, they further annexed the Czech part of Czechoslovakia and founded the Protectorate of Bohemia and Moravia, and annexed the Lithuanian port city of Klaipėda. The Slovak part of Czechoslovakia declared independence under German support and the Slovak Republic is established.

World War II broke out in 1939, when Germany invaded Poland with the Soviet Union. After occupying Poland, Germany started the conquest of Europe, and occupied Belgium, Luxembourg, Netherlands, Denmark, Norway, France and the British Channel Islands in 1940, Estonia, Latvia, Lithuania, Greece and Yugoslavia in 1941, Italy, Albania, Montenegro and Monaco in 1943, and Hungary in 1944. The French government continued to operate after the defeat, but was actually a client state of Germany.

Nazi Germany invaded the Soviet Union in 1941, only to face defeat. This marks the start of the collapse of the German Reich. On 8 May 1945, Nazi Germany officially surrendered and marks the end of the Nazi Regime.

United States 
 1848–present

The United States of America has exercised and continues to exercise worldwide economic, cultural, and military influence.

Founded in 1776 by thirteen coastal colonies that declared their independence from Great Britain, the United States began its western expansion following the end of the American Revolutionary War and the recognition of U.S. sovereignty in the 1783 Treaty of Paris. The treaty bequeathed to the nascent republic all land between the Appalachian Mountains and the Mississippi River, and Americans began migrating there in large numbers at the end of the 18th Century, resulting in the displacement of Native American cultures, often through native peoples' forcible deportation and violent wars of eviction. These efforts at expansion were greatly strengthened by the 1787 Constitutional Convention, which resulted in the ratification of the United States Constitution and transformed the U.S. from a loose confederation of semi-autonomous states into a federal entity with a strong national core. In 1803, the United States acquired Louisiana from France, doubling the country's size and extending its borders to the Rocky Mountains.

American power and population grew rapidly, so that by 1823 President James Monroe felt confident enough to issue his Monroe Doctrine, which proclaimed the Americas as the express sphere of the United States and threatened military action against any European power that attempted to make advances in the area. This was the beginning of the U.S.'s emergence as a regional power in North America. That process was confirmed in the Mexican–American War of 1846–1848, in which the United States, following a skirmish between Mexican and U.S. forces in land disputed between Mexico and the U.S., invaded Mexico. The war, which included the deployment of U.S. forces into Mexico, the taking of Veracruz by sea, and the occupation of Mexico City by American troops (which finally resulted in Mexico's defeat), stunned much of the world. In the peace treaty (Treaty of Guadelupe Hidalgo) that followed, the U.S. annexed the northern half of Mexico, comprising what is now the Southwestern United States. During the course of the war, the United States also negotiated by treaty the acquisition of the Oregon Territory's southern half from Great Britain. In 1867, William H. Seward, the U.S. Secretary of State, negotiated the purchase of Alaska from the Russian Empire. The United States defeated Spain in the Spanish–American War in 1898, and gained the possessions of Cuba, Puerto Rico, and the Philippines. The territory of Hawaii was also acquired in 1898. The United States became a major victorious power in both World Wars, and became a major economic power after World War I tires out the European powers.

Russian Empire and Soviet Union 
 1815–1917 and 1917–1991

The Russian Empire as a state, existed from 1721 until it was declared a republic 1 September 1917. The Russian Empire was the successor to the Tsardom of Russia and the predecessor of the Soviet Union. It was one of the largest empires in world history, surpassed in landmass only by the British and Mongolian empires: at one point in 1866, it stretched from Northern Europe across Asia and into North America.

At the beginning of the 19th century the Russian Empire extended from the Arctic Ocean in the north to the Black Sea on the south, from the Baltic Sea on the west to the Pacific Ocean on the east. With 125.6 million subjects registered by the 1897 census, it had the third largest population of the world at the time, after Qing China and the British Empire. Like all empires it represented a large disparity in economic, ethnic, and religious positions. Its government, ruled by the Emperor, was one of the last absolute monarchies in Europe. Prior to the outbreak of World War I in August 1914 Russia was one of the five major Great Powers of Europe.

Following the October Revolution that overthrew the Russian Republic, the Soviet Union was established by the Communist Party of the Soviet Union. The Soviet Union began to resemble the old Russian Empire in landmass, with its territory stretching from Eastern Europe to Siberia, and from Northern Europe to Central Asia.

After the death of the first Soviet leader, Vladimir Lenin, in 1924, Joseph Stalin eventually won a power struggle and led the country through a large-scale industrialization with a command economy and political repression. On 23 August 1939, after unsuccessful efforts to form an anti-fascist alliance with Western powers, the Soviets signed the non-aggression agreement with Nazi Germany. After the start of World War II, the formally neutral Soviets invaded and annexed territories of several Central and Eastern European states, including eastern Poland, the Baltic states, northeastern Romania and eastern Finland.

In June 1941 the Germans invaded, opening the largest and bloodiest theater of war in history. Soviet war casualties accounted for the majority of Allied casualties of the conflict in the process of acquiring the upper hand over Axis forces at intense battles such as Stalingrad. Soviet forces eventually captured Berlin and won World War II in Europe on 9 May 1945. The territory overtaken by the Red Army became satellite states of the Eastern Bloc. The Cold War emerged in 1947, where the Eastern Bloc confronted the Western Bloc, which would unite in the North Atlantic Treaty Organization in 1949.

Following Stalin's death in 1953, a period known as de-Stalinization and the Khrushchev Thaw occurred under the leadership of Nikita Khrushchev. The country developed rapidly, as millions of peasants were moved into industrialized cities. The USSR took an early lead in the Space Race with the first ever satellite and the first human spaceflight and the first probe to land on another planet, Venus. In the 1970s, there was a brief détente of relations with the United States, but tensions resumed when the Soviet Union deployed troops in Afghanistan in 1979. The war drained economic resources and was matched by an escalation of American military aid to Mujahideen fighters.

In the mid-1980s, the last Soviet leader, Mikhail Gorbachev, sought to further reform and liberalize the economy through his policies of glasnost and perestroika. The goal was to preserve the Communist Party while reversing economic stagnation. The Cold War ended during his tenure and in 1989, Warsaw Pact countries in Eastern Europe overthrew their respective Marxist–Leninist regimes. Strong nationalist and separatist movements broke out across the USSR. Gorbachev initiated a referendum—boycotted by the Baltic republics, Armenia, Georgia, and Moldova—which resulted in the majority of participating citizens voting in favor of preserving the Union as a renewed federation. In August 1991, a coup d'état was attempted by Communist Party hardliners. It failed, with Russian President Boris Yeltsin playing a high-profile role in facing down the coup. The main result was the banning of the Communist Party. The republics led by Russia and Ukraine declared independence. On 25 December 1991, Gorbachev resigned. All the republics emerged from the dissolution of the Soviet Union as independent post-Soviet states. The Russian Federation (formerly the Russian SFSR) assumed the Soviet Union's rights and obligations and is recognized as its continued legal personality in world affairs.

The Soviet Union produced many significant social and technological achievements and innovations regarding military power. It boasted the world's second-largest economy and the largest standing military in the world. The USSR was recognized as one of the five nuclear weapons states. It was a founding permanent member of the United Nations Security Council as well as a member of the OSCE, the WFTU and the leading member of the Council for Mutual Economic Assistance and the Warsaw Pact.

Before its dissolution, the USSR had maintained its status as a world superpower alongside the United States, for four decades after World War II. Sometimes also called "Soviet Empire", it exercised its hegemony in Central and Eastern Europe and worldwide with military and economic strength, proxy conflicts and influence in developing countries and funding of scientific research, especially in space technology and weaponry.

Italian Empire 

 1871–1947

The Italian colonial empire was created after the Kingdom of Italy joined other European powers in establishing colonies overseas during the "scramble for Africa". Modern Italy as a unified state only existed from 1861. By this time France, Spain, Portugal, Britain, and the Netherlands, had already carved out large empires over several hundred years. One of the last remaining areas open to colonisation was on the African continent.

By the outbreak of World War I in 1914, Italy had annexed Eritrea and Somalia, and had wrested control of portions of the Ottoman Empire, including Libya, though it was defeated in its attempt to conquer Ethiopia. The Fascist regime under Italian dictator Benito Mussolini which came to power in 1922 sought to increase the size of the empire further. Ethiopia was successfully taken, four decades after the previous failure, and Italy's European borders were expanded. An official "Italian Empire" was proclaimed on 9 May 1936 following the conquest of Ethiopia.

Italy sided with Nazi Germany during World War II but Britain soon captured Italian overseas colonies. By the time Italy itself was invaded in 1943, its empire had ceased to exist. On 8 September 1943 the Fascist regime of Mussolini collapsed, and a Civil War broke out between Italian Social Republic and Italian Resistance Movement, supported by Allied forces.

Empire of Japan 
 1868–1945

The Empire of Japan, officially the Empire of Great Japan or simply Great Japan (Dai Nippon), was an empire that existed from the Meiji Restoration on 3 January 1868 to the enactment of the post-World War II Constitution of Japan on 3 May 1947.

Imperial Japan's rapid industrialization and militarization under the slogan Fukoku Kyōhei (富国強兵, "Enrich the Country, Strengthen the Army") led to its emergence as a great power, eventually culminating in its membership in the Axis alliance and the conquest of a large part of the Asia-Pacific region. At the height of its power in 1942, the Japanese Empire ruled over a geographic area spanning . This made it the 12th largest empire in history.

In August 1914, former President of the United States William Howard Taft listed Japan and his country as the only two great powers uninvolved in World War I. After winning wars against China (First Sino-Japanese War, 1894–95) and Russia (Russo-Japanese War, 1904–05) the Japanese Empire was considered to be one of the major powers worldwide. The maximum extent of the empire was gained during Second World War, when Japan conquered many Asian and Pacific countries (see Greater East Asian Co-Prosperity Sphere).

After suffering many defeats and the atomic bombings of Hiroshima and Nagasaki, however, the Empire of Japan surrendered to the Allies on 2 September 1945. A period of occupation by the Allies followed the surrender, and a new constitution was created with American involvement. The constitution came into force on 3 May 1947, officially dissolving the Empire. American occupation and reconstruction of the country continued well into the 1950s, eventually forming the current nation-state whose title is simply that ("the nation of Japan" Nippon-koku) or just "Japan".

Post–Cold War era great powers

United States 

The United States was the foremost of the world's two superpowers during the Cold War. After the Cold War, the most common belief held that only the United States fulfilled the criteria to be considered a superpower. Its geographic area composed the third or fourth-largest state in the world, with an area of approximately 9.37 million km2. The population of the US was 248.7 million in 1990, at that time the fourth-largest nation.

In the mid-to-late 20th century, the political status of the US was defined as a strongly capitalist federation and constitutional republic. It had a permanent seat on the United Nations Security Council plus two allies with permanent seats, the United Kingdom and France. The US had strong ties with capitalist Europe, Latin America, the British Commonwealth, and several East Asian countries (South Korea, Taiwan, Japan). It allied itself with both right-wing dictatorships and democracies.

The political and economic force of the United States is also a major driving force of its power. Many states around the world would, over the course of the 20th century, adopt the economic policies of the Washington Consensus, sometimes against the wishes of their populations. The United States is a highly developed country, and its economy accounts for approximately a quarter of global GDP and is the world's largest by GDP at market exchange rates. By value, the United States is the world's largest importer and second-largest exporter. Although it accounts for just over 4.2% of the world's total population, the U.S. holds over 30% of the total wealth in the world, the largest share held by any country. The US has large resources of minerals, energy resources, metals, and timber, a large and modernized farming industry and a large industrial base. The United States dollar is the dominant world reserve currency under the Bretton Woods system. US systems were rooted in capitalist economic theory based on supply and demand, that is, production determined by customers' demands. America was allied with the G7 major economies. US economic policy prescriptions were the "standard" reform packages promoted for crisis-wracked developing countries by Washington, DC-based international institutions such as the International Monetary Fund (IMF), World Bank, as well as the US Treasury Department.

The military of the United States was a naval-based advanced military with by far the highest military expenditure in the world. The United States Navy was the world's largest navy, with the largest number of aircraft carriers, bases all over the world (particularly in an incomplete "ring" bordering the Warsaw Pact states to the west, south and east). The US had the largest nuclear arsenal in the world during the first half of the Cold War, one of the largest armies in the world and one of the two largest air forces in the world. Its powerful military allies in Western Europe (the North Atlantic Treaty Organization states) had their own nuclear capabilities. The US also possessed a powerful global intelligence network in the Central Intelligence Agency.

The cultural impact of the US, often known as Americanization, is seen in the influence on other countries of US music, TV, films, art, and fashion, as well as the desire for freedom of speech and other guaranteed rights its residents enjoy. Various styles of music born in the US have become globally influential.

The United States emerged as the world's sole superpower following the dissolution of the Soviet Union after the conclusion of the cold war. This was followed by a period where the United States was seen as in its greatest by the majority of the population inside of the United States. This led to a period of absolute dominance by the United States of America, stretching from 1993 to 2001. The War on Terrorism, the response to the Great Recession and the COVID-19 pandemic in the United States were all seen to damage the credibility of the United States.

In March 2003, the United States led an international coalition to invade Iraq because Saddam Hussein, then-President of Iraq, refused to cooperate with UN weapons inspectors seeking to verify that Iraq had dismantled its weapons of mass destruction capabilities. After a month of combat with Iraqi military and paramilitary units, the Battle of Baghdad was won by coalition forces, though an insurgency would soon emerge, greatly prolonging the American military presence in Iraq.

In 2011, the U.S. had 10 major strengths according to Chinese scholar Peng Yuan, the director of the Institute of American Studies of the China Institutes for Contemporary International Studies. He noted that the United States had a sizable population (300 million), enjoys its position as a two-ocean power, and has abundant natural resources. Besides, he believed that the United States' military muscle, high technology, fair education system, cultural power, cyber power, allies (as the United States has more allies than any other state), global force projection, intelligence capabilities (as demonstrated by the killing of Osama bin Laden), intellectual think tanks and research institutes, and strategic power (as the US is the world's only country with a truly global strategy) lead the United States into the superpower status it now enjoys. However, he noted that the recent breakdown of bipartisanship in the US, economic slowdown, intractable deficits and rising debt, societal polarization, and the weakening of US institutional power since the US can no longer dominate global institutions, are the current flaws of the United States' power.

China 

China became a great power during World War II as one of the Four Policemen and principal Allies of World War II. After the Korean war in 1950–1953 and the Sino-Soviet split in the 1960s, China emerged as one of the three big players in the tri-polar geopolitics (PRC-US-USSR) during the late Cold war (1956–1991) with its status as a recognized nuclear weapons state in the 1960s. Currently, China has the world's largest population, second largest GDP (nominal) (after the U.S.) and the largest economy in the world by PPP. China created the Belt and Road Initiative which according to analysts has been a geostrategic effort to take a more significant role in global affairs and challenge US post-war hegemony. It has also been argued that China co-founded the Asian Infrastructure Investment Bank and New Development Bank to compete with the World Bank and the International Monetary Fund in development finance. In 2015, China launched the Made in China 2025 strategic plan to further develop its manufacturing sector. There have been debates on the effectiveness and practicality of these programs in promoting China's global status.

According to The Economist, on a purchasing-power-parity (PPP) basis, the Chinese economy became the world's largest in 2013. On a foreign exchange rate basis, some estimates in 2020 and early 2021 said that China could overtake the U.S. in 2028, or 2026 if the Chinese currency further strengthened. As of July 2021, Bloomberg L.P. analysts estimated that China may either overtake the U.S. to become the world's biggest economy in the 2030s or never be able to reach such a goal.

The nation receives continual coverage in the popular press of its emerging superpower status, and has been identified as a rising or emerging economic growth and military superpower by academics and other experts. The "rise of China" has been named the top news story of the 21st century by the Global Language Monitor, as measured by the number of appearances in the global print and electronic media, on the Internet and blogosphere, and in social media. The term "Second Superpower" has been applied by scholars to the possibility that the People's Republic of China could emerge with global power and influence on par with the United States. The potential for the two countries to form stronger relations to address global issues is sometimes referred to as the Group of Two.

Barry Buzan asserted in 2004 that "China certainly presents the most promising all-round profile" of a potential superpower. Buzan claimed that "China is currently the most fashionable potential superpower and the one whose degree of alienation from the dominant international society makes it the most obvious political challenger." However, he noted this challenge is constrained by the major challenges of development and by the fact that its rise could trigger a counter-coalition of states in Asia.

Parag Khanna stated in 2008 that by making massive trade and investment deals with Latin America and Africa, China had established its presence as a superpower along with the European Union and the United States. China's rise is demonstrated by its ballooning share of trade in its gross domestic product. He believed that China's "consultative style" had allowed it to develop political and economic ties with many countries including those viewed as rogue states by the United States. He stated that the Shanghai Cooperation Organisation founded with Russia and the Central Asian countries may eventually be the "NATO of the East".

Historian Timothy Garton Ash argued in 2011, that the International Monetary Fund predicting that China's GDP (purchasing power parity adjusted) will overtake that of the United States in 2016, that a power shift to a world with several superpowers was happening in the early 21st century. However, China was still lacking in soft power and power projection abilities and had a low GDP/person. The article also stated that the Pew Research Center in a 2009 survey found that people in 15 out of 22 countries believed that China had or would overtake the US as the world's leading superpower.

In an interview given in 2011, Singapore's first premier, Lee Kuan Yew, stated that while China supplanting the United States is not a foregone conclusion, Chinese leaders are nonetheless serious about displacing the United States as the most powerful country in Asia. "They have transformed a poor society by an economic miracle to become now the second-largest economy in the world. How could they not aspire to be number 1 in Asia, and in time the world?" The Chinese strategy, Lee maintains, will revolve around their "huge and increasingly highly skilled and educated workers to out-sell and out-build all others". Nevertheless, relations with the United States, at least in the medium term, will not take a turn for the worse because China will "avoid any action that will sour up relations with the U.S. To challenge a stronger and technologically superior power like the U.S. will abort their 'peaceful rise.'" Though Lee believes China is genuinely interested in growing within the global framework the United States has created, it is biding its time until it becomes strong enough to successfully redefine the prevailing political and economic order.

China is thought to be becoming the world's largest economy and is making rapid progress in many areas. The United States is seen as a declining superpower as indicated by factors such as poor economic recovery, financial disorder, high deficits gaining close to GDP levels and unemployment, increasing political polarization, and overregulation forcing jobs overseas in China.

Some consensus has concluded that China has reached the qualifications of superpower status, citing China's growing political clout and leadership in the economic sectors has given the country renewed standings in the International Community. Although China's military projection is still premature and untested, the perceived humiliation of US leadership in failing to prevent its closest allies from joining the Asian Infrastructure Investment Bank, along with the Belt and Road Initiative and China's role in the worldwide groundings of the Boeing 737 MAX, was seen as a paradigm shift or an inflection point to the unipolar world order that dominated post-Cold War international relations. University Professor Øystein Tunsjø argues that competition between China and the USA will increase, leading to the gap between them decreasing, while the gap between the two countries and the rest of the top ten largest economies will widen. Additionally, economics correspondent, Peter S. Goodman and Beijing Bureau Chief of China, Jane Perlez further stated that China is using a combination of its economic might and growing military advancements to pressure, coerce and change the current world order to accommodate China's interests at the expense of the United States and its allies.

The 2019 Chinese Defense White Paper highlights the growing strategic competition between China and the United States. According to Anthony H. Cordesman, although the paper flags both China and the US as competing superpowers, it was far more moderate in its treatment of the US in contrast to the United States' view on Chinese military developments. Cordesman states that the paper was a warning that will shape Sino-American relations as China becomes stronger than Russia in virtually every aspect other than its nuclear arsenal.

On 19 August 2019, the United States Studies Centre published a report, suggesting that Washington no longer enjoys primacy in the Indo-Pacific. It stresses that the War on Terror has greatly distracted the US response to China's role in the Pacific; that US military force in the region has greatly atrophied whereas Beijing only grew stronger and more capable since 9/11, to the point that China could now actively challenge the United States over the Indo-Pacific. China's challenging the United States for global predominance constitutes the core issue in the debate over the American decline.

China's emergence as a global economic power is tied to its large working population. However, the population in China is aging faster than almost any other country in history. Current demographic trends could hinder economic growth, create challenging social problems, and limit China's capabilities to act as a new global hegemon. China's primarily debt-driven economic growth also creates concerns for substantial credit default risks and a potential financial crisis.

United Kingdom 

The United Kingdom of Great Britain and Northern Ireland is a sovereign country in north-western Europe, off the north-western coast of the European mainland. The United Kingdom includes the island of Great Britain, the north-eastern part of the island of Ireland, and many smaller islands within the British Isles. Northern Ireland shares a land border with the Republic of Ireland. Otherwise, the United Kingdom is surrounded by the Atlantic Ocean, with the North Sea to the east, the English Channel to the south and the Celtic Sea to the south-west, giving it the 12th-longest coastline in the world. The Irish Sea separates Great Britain and Ireland.

The nearby Isle of Man, Guernsey and Jersey are not part of the UK, being Crown Dependencies with the British Government responsible for defence and international representation. There are also 14 British Overseas Territories, the last remnants of the British Empire which, at its height in the 1920s, encompassed almost a quarter of the world's landmass and a third of the world's population, and was the largest empire in history. British influence can be observed in the language, culture and the legal and political systems of many of its former colonies.

The United Kingdom has the world's fifth-largest economy by nominal gross domestic product (GDP), and the tenth-largest by purchasing power parity (PPP). It has a high-income economy and a very high human development index rating, ranking 13th in the world. The UK became the world's first industrialised country and was the world's foremost power during the 19th and early 20th centuries. Today the UK remains one of the world's great powers, with considerable economic, cultural, military, scientific, technological and political influence internationally. It is a recognised nuclear state and is ranked fourth globally in military expenditure. It has been a permanent member of the United Nations Security Council since its first session in 1946.

The United Kingdom is a member of the Commonwealth of Nations, the Council of Europe, the G7, the Group of Ten, the G20, the United Nations, NATO, AUKUS, the Organisation for Economic Co-operation and Development (OECD), Interpol, and the World Trade Organization (WTO). It was a member state of the European Communities (EC) and its successor, the European Union (EU), from its accession in 1973 until its withdrawal in 2020 following a referendum held in 2016.

Since the end of the second World War, the United Kingdom has been described as a "super power in decline". Nonetheless, a 2019 study in geopolitical capability found the United Kingdom to be the most powerful nation in Europe and the second most powerful in the world behind the United States. In the aftermath of the second World War and the Suez crisis, the United Kingdom substantially declined as a world power. Towards the end of the 20th century, and especially under the Conservative-led government of Margaret Thatcher and the Labour-led government of Tony Blair, the United Kingdom underwent a period of strong economic growth and cultural reach, especially in the United States; the relationship between the UK and the US is generally considered to be among the strongest international relationships. A notable break in this tradition occurred under the administration of Barack Obama who sought to align with Germany as a principal European ally. Although a highly controversial figure in the United Kingdom, President Donald Trump described the UK-US relationship as "just so important" and the administration of President Joe Biden has restored traditional relations, reiterating that "the United States has no closer ally than the United Kingdom".

The UK has been described as a "cultural superpower", and London has been described as a world cultural capital. A global opinion poll for the BBC saw the UK ranked the third most positively viewed nation in the world (behind Germany and Canada) in 2013 and 2014, although the 2003 War in Iraq considerably damaged perception of the UK outside of the Anglosphere. While the United Kingdom has maintained "exceptionally strong" relations with Italy and the Netherlands, the decision to withdraw from the European Union sparked sharp criticism of the United Kingdom across other major European powers.

France 

France is considered to be a great power. France retains its centuries-long status as a global centre of art, science and philosophy. It hosts the fifth-largest number of UNESCO World Heritage Sites and is the world's leading tourist destination, receiving over 89 million foreign visitors in 2018. France is a cultural superpower. France is a developed country with the world's fifth-largest economy by nominal GDP and eight-largest by PPP; in terms of aggregate household wealth, it ranks fourth in the world. France performs well in international rankings of education, health care, life expectancy and human development. It remains a great power in global affairs, being one of the five permanent members of the United Nations Security Council and an official nuclear-weapon state. France is a founding and leading member of the European Union and the Eurozone, as well as a key member of the Group of Seven, North Atlantic Treaty Organization (NATO), Organisation for Economic Co-operation and Development (OECD) and La Francophonie. It is also a transcontinental country spanning Western Europe and overseas regions and territories in the Americas and the Atlantic, Pacific and Indian Oceans. Including all of its territories, France has twelve time zones, the most of any country. Its metropolitan area extends from the Rhine to the Atlantic Ocean and from the Mediterranean Sea to the English Channel and the North Sea; overseas territories include French Guiana in South America, Saint Pierre and Miquelon in the North Atlantic, the French West Indies, and several islands in Oceania and the Indian Ocean. Due to its several coastal territories, France has the largest exclusive economic zone in the world. France borders Belgium, Luxembourg, Germany, Switzerland, Monaco, Italy, Andorra and Spain in Europe, as well as the Netherlands, Suriname and Brazil in the Americas.

France has a developed, high-income mixed economy, characterised by sizeable government involvement, economic diversity, a skilled labour force, and high innovation. For roughly two centuries, the French economy has consistently ranked among the ten largest globally; it is currently the world's eight-largest by purchasing power parity, the fifth-largest by nominal GDP, and the second-largest in the European Union by both metrics. France is considered an economic power, with membership in the Group of Seven leading industrialised countries, the Organisation for Economic Co-operation and Development (OECD), and the Group of Twenty largest economies.

France's economy is highly diversified; services represent two-thirds of both the workforce and GDP, while the industrial sector accounts for a fifth of GDP and a similar proportion of employment. France is the third-biggest manufacturing country in Europe, behind Germany and Italy, and ranks eighth in the world by share of global manufacturing output, at 1.9 percent. Less than 2 percent of GDP is generated by the primary sector, namely agriculture; however, France's agricultural sector is among the largest in value and leads the EU in terms of overall production.

In 2018, France was the fifth-largest trading nation in the world and the second-largest in Europe, with the value of exports representing over a fifth of GDP. Its membership in the Eurozone and the broader European Single Market facilitate access to capital, goods, services, and skilled labour. Despite protectionist policies over certain industries, particularly in agriculture, France has generally played a leading role in fostering free trade and commercial integration in Europe in order to enhance its economy. In 2019, it ranked first in Europe and 13th in the world in foreign direct investment, with European countries and the United States being leading sources. According to the Bank of France, the leading recipients of FDI were manufacturing, real estate, finance and insurance. The Paris region has the highest concentration of multinational firms in Europe.

With 31 companies that are part of the world's biggest 500 companies, France was in 2020 the most represented European country in the 2020 Fortune Global 500, ahead of Germany (27 companies) and the UK (22).

As of August 2020, France was also the country that weighed the most on the Eurozone's EURO STOXX 50 (representing 36.4% of all total assets), ahead of Germany (35.2%).

Several French corporations rank amongst the largest in their industries such as AXA in insurance and Air France in air transportation. Luxury and consumer good are particularly relevant, with L'Oreal being the world's largest cosmetic company while LVMH and Kering are the world's two largest luxury product companies. In energy and utilities, GDF-Suez and EDF are amongst the largest energy companies in the world, and Areva is a large nuclear-energy company; Veolia Environnement is the world's largest environmental services and water management company; Vinci SA, Bouygues and Eiffage are large construction companies; Michelin ranks in the top 3 tire manufacturers; JCDecaux is the world's largest outdoor advertising corporation; BNP Paribas, Credit Agricole and Société Générale rank amongst the largest in the world by assets. Capgemini and Atos are among the largest technology consulting companies.

Carrefour is the world's second-largest retail group in terms of revenue; Total is the world's fourth-largest private oil company; Danone is the world's fifth-largest food company and the world's largest supplier of mineral water; Sanofi is the world's fifth-largest pharmaceutical company; Publicis is the world's third-largest advertising company; Groupe PSA is the world's 6th and Europe's 2nd largest automaker; Accor is the leading European hotel group; Alstom is one of the world's leading conglomerates in rail transport.

Under the doctrine of Dirigisme, the government historically played a major role in the economy; policies such as indicative planning and nationalisation are credited for contributing to three decades of unprecedented postwar economic growth known as Trente Glorieuses. At its peak in 1982, the public sector accounted for one-fifth of industrial employment and over four-fifths of the credit market. Beginning in the late 20th century, France loosened regulations and state involvement in the economy, with most leading companies now being privately owned; state ownership now dominates only transportation, defence and broadcasting. Policies aimed at promoting economic dynamism and privatisation have improved France's economic standing globally: it is among the world's 10 most innovative countries in the 2020 Bloomberg Innovation Index, and the 15th most competitive, according to the 2019 Global Competitiveness Report (up two places from 2018).

According to the IMF, France ranked 30th in GDP per capita, with roughly $45,000 per inhabitant. It placed 23rd in the Human Development Index, indicating very high human development. Public corruption is among the lowest in the world, with France consistently ranking among the 30 least corrupt countries since the Corruption Perceptions Index began in 2012; it placed 22nd in 2021, up one place from the previous year. France is Europe's second-largest spender in research and development, at over 2 percent of GDP; globally, it ranks 12th. France is also the second largest contributor to the European Space Agency after Germany.

Financial services, banking, and insurance are important part of the economy. AXA is the world's second-largest insurance company by total nonbanking assets in 2020. As of 2011, the three largest financial institutions cooperatively owned by their customers were French: Crédit Agricole, Groupe Caisse D'Epargne, and Groupe Caisse D'Epargne. According to a 2020 report by S&P Global Market Intelligenc, France's leading banks, BNP Paribas and Crédit Agricole, are among the top world's 10 largest bank by assets, with Société Générale and Groupe BPCE ranking 17th and 19th globally, respectively.

Paris is a leading global city, and has one of the largest city GDP in the world and the largest in Europe. It ranks as the first city in Europe (and 3rd worldwide) by the number of companies classified in Fortunes Fortune Global 500. Paris produced US$984 billion at market exchange rates) or around 1/3 of the economy of France''' in 2021 while the economy of the Paris metropolitan area — the largest in Europe with London—generates around 1/3 of France's GDP or around $1.0 trillion. Paris has been ranked as the 2nd most attractive global city in the world in 2019 by KPMG. La Défense, Paris's Central Business District, was ranked by Ernst & Young in 2017 as the leading business district in continental Europe, and fourth in the world. The OECD is headquartered in Paris, the nation's financial capital. The other major economic centres of the country include Lyon, Toulouse (centre of the European aerospace industry), Marseille and Lille.

The Paris stock exchange is one of the oldest in the world, created by Louis XV in 1724. In 2000, it merged with counterparts in Amsterdam and Brussels to form Euronext, which in 2007 merged with the New York stock exchange to form NYSE Euronext, the world's largest stock exchange. Euronext Paris, the French branch of Euronext, is Europe's second-largest stock exchange market, behind the London Stock Exchange.

 Russia 

Russia, the world's largest nation, is home to over 30% of the world's natural resources according to some sources. Since its imperial times, it has been both a great power and a regional power. Throughout most of the Soviet-era, Russia was one of the world's two superpowers. However, after the dissolution of the Soviet Union, it lost its superpower status, and recently has been suggested as a potential candidate for resuming superpower status in the 21st century.New York Times by Ronald Steel professor of international relations August 24, 2008 (Superpower Reborn) While others have made the assertion that it is already a superpower. In 2009, Hugo Chavez, late President of Venezuela whose government was noted to have enjoyed warm relations with the Kremlin, stated that "Russia is a superpower", citing waning American influence in global affairs, and suggested the ruble be elevated to a global currency. Israeli Prime Minister Benjamin Netanyahu called Russia an important superpower, praising its effectiveness as an ally of Israel. In his 2005 publication entitled Russia in the 21st Century: The Prodigal Superpower, Steven Rosefielde, a professor of economics at University of North Carolina at Chapel Hill, predicted that Russia would emerge as a superpower before 2010 and augur another arms race. However, Rosefielde noted that such an end would come with tremendous sacrifice to global security and the Russian people's freedom.

In 2014, Stephen Kinzer of The Boston Globe compared Russia's actions with its own neighbouring territories, to those of "any other superpower", taking Ukraine and Crimea as examples. A mixed opinion has been offered by Matthew Fleischer of the Los Angeles Times: he contends that Russia will not become a superpower unless climate change eats away at the permafrost that covers, as of March 2014, two-thirds of the country's landmass. The absence of this permafrost would reveal immense stores of oil, natural gas, and precious minerals, as well as potential farmland, which would allow Russia to "become the world's bread basket—and control the planet's food supply".

Russian news agency RIA Novosti called Russia a "superpower" after its actions in Syria, and after the formation of a coalition to fight ISIS in Syria and Iraq, Benny Avni of the New York Post called Russia the "world's new sole superpower".

However, several analysts commented on the fact that Russia showed signs of an aging and shrinking population. Fred Weir said that this severely constricts and limits Russia's potential to re-emerge as a central world power. In 2011, British historian and professor Niall Ferguson also highlighted the negative effects of Russia's declining population, and suggested that Russia is on its way to "global irrelevance". Russia has, however, shown a slight population growth since the late 2000s, partly due to immigration and slowly rising birth rates.

Nathan Smith of the National Business Review has said that despite Russia having potential, it did not win the new "Cold War" in the 1980s, and thus makes superpower status inaccurate. Dmitry Medvedev predicted that if the Russian elite is not consolidated, Russia will disappear as a single state. Vladimir Putin said the moment the Caucasus leaves Russia, other territorial regions would follow.

Besides, other analysts state that despite having a formidable military, Russia can only be considered as a regional power as it only has major political and military influences on most Post-Soviet states, but not a country which has international economic influence like China. After Russia's poor performance in the 2022 Russian invasion of Ukraine, some analysts have begun to question Russia's military and power projection capabilities.

 Germany 
Germany is a great power with a strong economy; it has the largest economy in Europe, the world's fourth-largest economy by nominal GDP, and the fifth-largest by PPP. As a global leader in several industrial, scientific and technological sectors, it is both the world's third-largest exporter and importer of goods. As a developed country, which ranks very high on the Human Development Index, it offers social security and a universal health care system, environmental protections, and a tuition-free university education. Germany is a member of the United Nations, NATO, the G7, the G20, and the OECD. It has the third-greatest number of UNESCO World Heritage Sites.

Germany also has a social market economy with a highly skilled labour force, a low level of corruption, and a high level of innovation. It is the world's third-largest exporter and third-largest importer of goods, and has the largest economy in Europe, which is also the world's fourth-largest economy by nominal GDP, and the fifth-largest by PPP. Its GDP per capita measured in purchasing power standards amounts to 121% of the EU27 average (100%). The service sector contributes approximately 69% of the total GDP, industry 31%, and agriculture 1% . The unemployment rate published by Eurostat amounts to 3.2% , which is the fourth-lowest in the EU.

Germany is part of the European single market which represents more than 450 million consumers. In 2017, the country accounted for 28% of the Eurozone economy according to the International Monetary Fund. Germany introduced the common European currency, the Euro, in 2002. Its monetary policy is set by the European Central Bank, which is headquartered in Frankfurt.

Being home to the modern car, the automotive industry in Germany is regarded as one of the most competitive and innovative in the world, and is the fourth-largest by production. The top ten exports of Germany are vehicles, machinery, chemical goods, electronic products, electrical equipments, pharmaceuticals, transport equipments, basic metals, food products, and rubber and plastics.

Of the world's 500 largest stock-market-listed companies measured by revenue in 2019, the Fortune Global 500, 29 are headquartered in Germany. 40 major Germany-based companies are included in the DAX, the German stock market index which is operated by Frankfurt Stock Exchange. Well-known international brands include Mercedes-Benz, BMW, Volkswagen, Audi, Siemens, Allianz, Adidas, Porsche, Bosch and Deutsche Telekom. Berlin is a hub for startup companies and has become the leading location for venture capital funded firms in the European Union. Germany is recognised for its large portion of specialised small and medium enterprises, known as the  model. These companies represent 48% global market leaders in their segments, labelled hidden champions.

Research and development efforts form an integral part of the German economy. In 2018 Germany ranked fourth globally in terms of number of science and engineering research papers published. Germany was ranked 9th in the Global Innovation Index in 2019 and 2020. Research institutions in Germany include the Max Planck Society, the Helmholtz Association, and the Fraunhofer Society and the Leibniz Association. Germany is the largest contributor to the European Space Agency.

 Japan 
Japan is a great power and a member of numerous international organizations, including the United Nations (since 1956), the OECD, and the Group of Seven. Although it has renounced its right to declare war, the country maintains Self-Defense Forces that rank as one of the world's strongest militaries. After World War II, Japan experienced record growth in an economic miracle, becoming the second-largest economy in the world by 1990. Japanese economy was the world's second largest economy in terms of GDP until it was surpassed by China in 2010. , the country's economy is the third-largest by nominal GDP and the fourth-largest by PPP. It is also ranked "very high" on the Human Development Index.

In the 1980s, many political and economic analysts predicted that Japan would eventually accede to superpower status, due to its large population, huge gross domestic product and high economic growth at that time. Japan was expected to eventually surpass the economy of the United States, which never happened. However, Japan is considered a cultural superpower in terms of the large-scale influence Japanese food, music, video games, manga, anime and movies have on the world. In 2021, U.S. News & World Report ranked Japan as the most culturally influential country in Asia and 5th in the world.

Japan is also considered to be a technological power, being the leader in the automotive, electronics (though its present-day position in the electronics field had declined by the 2010s) and robotics industries.
Japan's most valuable and internationally known brands include: Toyota, Honda, Sony, Soft Bank, Subaru, Nissan, Mazda, Canon Inc. and Nintendo.

Japan was ranked as the world's fourth most-powerful military in 2015. The military capabilities of the Japan Self-Defense Forces are held back by the pacifist 1947 constitution. However, there is a gradual push for a constitutional amendment. On 18 September 2015, the National Diet enacted the 2015 Japanese military legislation, a series of laws that allow Japan's Self-Defense Forces to collective self-defense of allies in combat for the first time under its constitution. In May 2017, former Japanese Prime Minister Shinzo Abe set a 2020 deadline for revising Article 9, which would legitimize the JSDF in the Constitution.

 India 

The Republic of India is considered a great power, but the country was not considered a great power until recently, given its recent history and economic and military expansion. There is no collective agreement among observers for the status of India. However, many scholars believe that India is a great power or emerging as so.Encarta – Great Powers  It maintains one of the largest armed forces and military budgets in the world. Since the 1990s, Indian culture has become more prominent around the world. Bollywood movies and Indian cuisine are some of the major aspects of the culture of India. Although India maintains a position as a major economic and military power, it is not a permanent member of the United Nations Security Council.

India has seen considerable coverage of its potential of becoming a superpower, both in the media and among academics. In 2006, Newsweek and the International Herald Tribune joined several academics in discussing India's potential of becoming a superpower.

Anil Gupta believes that due to India's functional institutions of democracy, the country will emerge as a desirable, entrepreneurial and resource and energy-efficient superpower in the near future. He had predicted the nation's emergence as a full-fledged economic superpower by 2025. In addition, he believed that India has the potential to serve as a leading example of how to combine rapid economic growth with fairness towards and inclusion of those at the bottom rungs of the ladder and of efficient resource utilization, especially in energy. India briefly became the world's fastest growing economy in 2015 but growth declined below China's since 2018.

Economists and Researchers at Harvard University have projected India's 7% projected annual growth rate through 2024 would continue to put it ahead of China, making India the fastest growing economy in the world. In 2017, Center for International Development at Harvard University, published a research study, projecting that India has emerged as the economic pole of global growth by surpassing China and is expected to maintain its lead over the coming decade.

Robyn Meredith pointed out in 2007 that the average incomes of European and Americans are higher than Chinese and Indians, and hundreds of millions of Chinese as well as Indians live in poverty, she also suggested that economic growth of these nations has been the most important factor in reducing global poverty of the last two decades, as per the World Bank report.Amy Chua adds to this, that India has made tremendous strides to fix its internal problems, stating that some of India's achievements, such as working to dismantle the centuries-old caste system and maintaining the world's largest diverse democracy, are historically unprecedented.

Fareed Zakaria pointing out that India's young population coupled with the second-largest English-speaking population in the world could give India an advantage over China. He also believes that while other industrial countries will face a youth gap, India will have many young people, or in other words, workers, and by 2050, its per capita income will rise by twenty times its current level. According to Zakaria, another strength that India has is that its democratic government has lasted for 60 years, stating that a democracy can provide for long-term stability, which has given India a name.

Clyde V. Prestowitz Jr., founder and president of the Economic Strategy Institute and former counselor to the Secretary of Commerce in the Reagan administration, has predicted that "It is going to be India's century. India is going to be the biggest economy in the world. It is going to be the biggest superpower of the 21st century."

According to the report named "Indian Century: Defining India's Place in a Rapidly Changing Global Economy" by IBM Institute for Business Value, India is predicted to be among the world's highest-growth nations over the coming years.

 Brazil 
The Federative Republic of Brazil is considered a great power, and also an environmental superpower, its home to diverse wildlife, a variety of ecological systems, and extensive natural resources spanning numerous protected habitats This unique environmental heritage positions inputs responsibilities in the preservation of the Amazon, creating a fund for mainteance of the rainforest and a preserving rainforest pact. Brazil has been central in the discussions concerning the climate changes and hosting the United Nations Conference on Sustainable Development. 

The economy of Brazil is historically the largest in Latin America and the Southern Hemisphere in nominal terms. The Brazilian economy is the third largest in the Americas. The economy is a middle income developing mixed economy. In 2022, according to International Monetary Fund (IMF), Brazil has the 12th largest gross domestic product expenditure (GDP) and has the 8th largest purchasing power parity. Brazil is a member of diverse economic organizations, such as Mercosur, Prosur, G8+5, G20, WTO, Paris Club, Cairns Group, and is advanced to be a permanent member of the OECD.

Is the largest country in South America and in Latin America. At 8.5 million square kilometers (3,300,000 sq mi) and with over 217 million people, Brazil is the world's fifth-largest country by area and the seventh most populous.

Brazil is member of various international organizations, and is actively engaged in the reform of the United Nations Security Council. It formed the G4 alliance with Germany, India, and Japan for the purpose of supporting each other's bids for permanent seats. Their proposal calls for an enlarged Security Council, expanded in both the permanent and non-permanent categories of membership. A wide coalition of member states from all regional groups of the United Nations supported the initiative.

As a founding member of the United Nations, Brazil has a long tradition of contributing to peacekeeping operations. Brazil has participated in 33 United Nations peacekeeping operations and contributed with over 27,000 troops. Currently, Brazil contributes with more than 2,200 troops, military observers and police officers in three continents.

Brazil has led the military component of the United Nations Stabilisation Mission in Haiti (MINUSTAH) since its establishment in 2004. The mission's Force Commander is Major General Fernando Rodrigues Goulart of the Brazilian Army. Brazil is the biggest troop contributing country to MINUSTAH, with 2,200 active military personnel.

 Italy 
Italy has been referred to as a great European power with almost the same power as Germany, France, and the UK., but due to internal political instability, a large public debt, a diminishing economic productivity, low economic growth in the last ten years and a significant Centre-North/South socio-economic divide, it is considered as the least of the great powers. Due to the lack of international influence in recent years, Italy is now considered as a European power instead of a global power.

Italy's great power strength includes a vast advanced economy (in terms of national wealth, net wealth per capita and national GDP), a strong manufacturing industry, a large luxury goods market, a large national budget and the third largest gold reserve in the world. It has one of the largest SDRs and Voting Power in the IMF. The country is a cultural superpower and it has close ties with the rest of the Catholic world as the home of the Pope. Italy is a key player in maintaining international security, especially in the wider Mediterranean region, by performing air policing duties for its allies and commanding multinational forces in foreign countries. The country has therefore developed considerable military capabilities by building two aircraft carriers and establishing some overseas military bases. The Italian navy was the first to launch an intermediate-range ballistic missile from the sea, an UGM-27 Polaris launched from the cruiser Giuseppe Garibaldi. The country is home to two nuclear bases and, as part of the NATO nuclear sharing program, therefore has a retaliatory nuclear capacity despite nominally being a non-nuclear state. According to the former Italian President Francesco Cossiga, Italy's plans of nuclear retaliation during the Cold War consisted of targeting nuclear weapons in Czechoslovakia and Hungary in case the Soviet Union waged nuclear war against NATO. He acknowledged the presence of U.S. nuclear weapons in Italy, and speculated about the possible presence of British and French nuclear weapons.
Italy secretly developed its own nuclear weapons program, and one in collaboration with France and Germany, but abandoned such projects when it joined the nuclear sharing program. The country has developed the ABM PAAMS system. It has developed several space-launch vehicles such as Alfa and more recently Vega. In more recent years, under the auspices of European space agency, it has demonstrated the reentry and landing of a spacecraft, the Intermediate eXperimental Vehicle. Italy is home to one of two ground operations centres of the Galileo global satellite navigation system.

Besides, Italy has as one of the most advanced economies in the world as the eighth-largest economy by nominal GDP (third in the European Union), the sixth-largest national wealth and the third-largest central bank gold reserve. It ranks very high in life expectancy, quality of life, healthcare, and education. The country is considered a great power and it plays a prominent role in regional"Operation Alba may be considered one of the most important instances in which Italy has acted as a regional power, taking the lead in executing a technically and politically coherent and determined strategy." See Federiga Bindi, Italy and the European Union (Washington, D.C.: Brookings Institution Press, 2011), p. 171. and global ("The great powers are super-sovereign states: an exclusive club of the most powerful states economically, militarily, politically and strategically. These states include veto-wielding members of the United Nations Security Council (United States, United Kingdom, France, China, and Russia), as well as economic powerhouses such as Germany, Italy and Japan.") economic, military, cultural, and diplomatic affairs. Italy is a founding and leading member of the European Union and a member of numerous international institutions, including the United Nations, NATO, the OECD, the Organization for Security and Co-operation in Europe, the World Trade Organization, the Group of Seven, the G20, the Union for the Mediterranean, the Latin Union, the Council of Europe, Uniting for Consensus, the Schengen Area, and many more. The source of many inventions and discoveries, the country has long been a global centre of art, music, literature, philosophy, science and technology, and fashion, and has greatly influenced and contributed to diverse fields including cinema, cuisine, sports, jurisprudence, banking, and business. As a reflection of its cultural wealth, Italy has the world's largest number of World Heritage Sites (58), and is the fifth-most visited country.

Moreover, Italy contributes greatly to scientific research and operates some permanent research stations in Antarctica. In terms of spaceflight capability, the country owns the Broglio Space Centre. The country is a major contributor to the European Space Agency and the International Space Station.

 See also 
 Cold War 1947–1989
 Concert of Europe, after 1814
 Diplomatic history of World War I
 Diplomatic history of World War II
 European balance of power
 Foreign policy of the Russian Empire
 Great Eastern Crisis, 1875–1878
 Historic recurrence
 Historiography of the British Empire
 History of the foreign relations of the United Kingdom
 Pax Britannica Timeline of British diplomatic history
 History of colonialism
 History of French foreign relations
 History of German foreign policy
 History of globalization
 International relations (1648–1814)
 International relations (1919–1939)
 International relations (1814–1919)
 List of ancient great powers
 List of largest empires
 List of medieval great powers
 Precedence among European monarchies
 Middle power
 New Imperialism
 Potential superpower
 Power (international relations)
 Timeline of European imperialism
 Timeline of United States diplomatic history

 Notes 

 References 

Bibliography
 
 
 
 
 
 
 
 
 

 Further reading 
 Banks, Arthur. (1988) A World Atlas of Military History 1861–1945 
 Cambridge Modern History Atlas (1912) online. 141 maps
 Catchpole, Brian. (1982) Map History of the Modern World 
 Cooper, F. (2008). Empires and Political Imagination in World History. Princeton [u.a.]: Princeton University Press.
 Daniels, Patricia S. and Stephen G. Hyslop, Almanac of World History (3rd ed 2014); 384pp well illustrated
 Doyle, M. W. (1986). Empires. Ithaca, N.Y: Cornell University Press.
 Farrington, K. (2003). Historical Atlas of Empires. London: Mercury.
 Grenville, J.A.S. (1994) A History of the World in the Twentieth Century (1994). online
 Haywood, John. (1997) Atlas of world history online
 Joffe, Josef. The myth of America's decline: Politics, economics, and a half century of false prophecies ( WW Norton & Company, 2014).
 Kinder, Hermann and Werner Hilgemann. The Penguin Atlas of World History (2 vol, 2004); advanced topical atlas. excerpt of vol 1 also see excerpt vol 2
 Langer, William, ed. (1973) An Encyclopedia of World History (1948 And later editions) online
 Stearns, Peter, ed. The Encyclopedia of World History (2007), 1245pp; update of Langer
 
 Pella, John & Erik Ringmar, (2019) History of international relations Online  
 O'Brian, Patrick K. Atlas of World History (2007) online
 Pastor, Robert, ed. A Century's Journey How The Great Powers Shape The World (2000)
 Rand McNally Atlas of World History (1983), maps #76–81. Published in Britain as the Hamlyn Historical Atlas online
 Roberts, J. M. and Odd Arne Westad, eds. The Penguin History of the World (6th ed. 2014) 1280pp excerpt
 Robertson, Charles Grant. An historical atlas of modern Europe from 1789 to 1922 with an historical and explanatory text'' (1922) online

Countries
Year of birth missing (living people)

History of international relations
Lists of countries
Great powers
Modern history